The Australian Made, Australian Grown trade mark logo signifies products whose ingredients or production mostly originate from Australia. The triangular green-and-gold logo, featuring a kangaroo, was introduced in 1986. The Australian Made, Australian Grown logo is administered by Australian Made Campaign Limited (AMCL).

History
In the 1930s a group of businesses gathered up and created a media campaign to publicise Australian made products.

In 1961, a national "Buy Australian" campaign was introduced by the Associated Chambers of Manufacturers of Australia. The campaign was launched by Prime Minister Robert Menzies in May 1961. The campaign was colloquially known at the time as Operation Boomerang. About the same time, the campaign introduced an emblem featuring a red boomerang on a blue circular background depicting the Southern Cross.

A new green-and-gold coloured triangular-shaped "Australian Made" logo featuring a stylised kangaroo was introduced as part of the "Australian Made" campaign launched by Prime Minister Bob Hawke on 31 August 1986. The logo was designed by Ken Cato.

In 2002, the federal government transferred ownership of the logo to Australian Made Campaign Limited, a not-for-profit public company established in 1999 which now administers the logo.

From 1 July 2016, the Australian Government has changed food labelling laws to add a bar showing the percentage of Australian ingredients for any product made in Australia. Any business in Australia will have from 1 July 2016 to 30 June 2018 to comply with the new rule.

South Africa, New Zealand, and Canada have consulted with Australian Made on developing their own branding campaigns.

Concept
Local purchasing is a preference to buy locally produced goods and services over those produced more distantly. In the context of the Australian Made and Australian Grown brands the purpose being to encourage consumers to exercise their preference for buying Australian, and promoting Australian products in Australia and markets around the world. The Australian Made logo represents a country of origin label.

Many countries have similar buy local initiatives such as Made in USA.

The cost of using the Australian Made logo is between $300 and $25,000 depending on sales revenue.

See also

 Products manufactured in Australia
 Australia Made Preference League (1920s)
 Buy Australian Logo (2012 - Current)

References

External links
 

National production certification marks
Economy of Australia
Symbols introduced in 1986
 
Australian logos
1986 in Australia